Tryptophanyl aminopeptidase (tryptophan aminopeptidase, L-tryptophan aminopeptidase) is an enzyme. This enzyme catalyses the following chemical reaction

 Preferential release of N-terminal tryptophan

This enzyme from Trichosporon cutaneum also acts on L-tryptophanamide.

References

External links 
 

EC 3.4.11